Lake Ellen is a lake in Chisago County, Minnesota, in the United States.

Lake Ellen was named for an early settler.

See also
List of lakes in Minnesota

References

Lakes of Minnesota
Lakes of Chisago County, Minnesota